Persian Gulf Petrochemical Industries Corporation (PGPIC, Shirkat-e Sânai'-ye Petrushimi-ye Xelij-e Fars) is an Iranian public holding company. it is mainly active in investment and administrating natural-gas processing plants, chemical factories, oil and polymer.

It was built by National Petrochemical Company in 2011 with 800 billion Toman capital. It was the second most profitable Iranian company in 2015. It is the second biggest petrochemical company after SABIC in the middle east. The company generated a total of 1.2 billion dollars in revenue over the first three months (Q1) in 2018.

US Treasury sanctioned PGPIC for aiding Khatam al Anbiya construction base in 2019.

In 2019 it was the 35th in ICIS top 100 chemical companies list.

References 

Holding companies of Iran
Petrochemical companies
Conglomerate companies of Iran
Companies listed on the Tehran Stock Exchange
Conglomerate companies established in 2007
Non-renewable resource companies established in 2007
Iranian companies established in 2007
Chemical companies established in 2007